James Elliot Dapogny (September 3, 1940, Berwyn, Illinois – March 6, 2019, Ann Arbor, Michigan) was an American jazz musicologist, pianist, composer, arranger and bandleader, active principally in the traditional jazz revival scene.

Early life 
Dapogny earned a Ph.D in composition, and taught at the University of Michigan beginning in 1966. Dapogny led an ensemble called James Dapogny's Chicago Jazz Band, founded in 1975, which played with Sippie Wallace and the Chenille Sisters and made many appearances on Prairie Home Companion.

Dapogny wrote extensively about Jelly Roll Morton, including liner notes for the release of his Library of Congress recordings. He also edited Jazz Masterworks Editions, a series initiated by Oberlin College and the Smithsonian Institution.

James Dapogny's Chicago Jazz Band members
Jon-Erik Kellso - trumpet
Mike Karoub - bass
Russ Whitman - reeds
Kim Cusack - reeds
Chris Smith - trombone
Rod McDonald - guitar, banjo
Wayne Jones - drums

Discography
 The Piano Music of Jelly Roll Morton (Smithsonian Folkways, 1976)
 Back Home in Illinois (Jazzology, 1982)
 Chicago Jazz Band (Jazzology, 1982)
 How Could We Be Blue? (Stomp Off, 1988)
 The Way We Feel Today (Stomp Off, 1988)
 Laughing at Life (Discovery, 1992)
 Original Jelly Roll Blues (Discovery, 1993)
 Hot Club Stomp: Small Band Swing (Discovery, 1995)
 On the Road (Schoolkids, 1995)
 Rhythm Club (Jazz Pie, 2006)

References

Craig Harris, [ James Dapogny] at Allmusic

American musicologists
American jazz bandleaders
American jazz pianists
American male pianists
People from Berwyn, Illinois
1940 births
University of Michigan faculty
20th-century American pianists
Jazz musicians from Illinois
21st-century American pianists
20th-century American male musicians
21st-century American male musicians
American male jazz musicians
2019 deaths
Folkways Records artists
Jazzology Records artists
Stomp Off artists
Discovery Records artists